is a former Japanese football player.

Playing career
Matsuyo was born in Nara on April 9, 1974. After graduating from Tenri University, he joined J1 League club Gamba Osaka in 1997. However he could hardly play in the match behind Hayato Okanaka and Ryota Tsuzuki until early 2002. From August 2002, he became a regular goalkeeper instead Tsuzuki. However he got hurt in August 2005 and he lost regular position behind Yosuke Fujigaya who came to Gamba Osaka in this season. From 2005, although he battles with Fujigaya for the position, he could not become regular goalkeeper. The club won the champions 2005 J1 League, 2007 J.League Cup and 2008 Emperor's Cup. In Asia, the club also won the champions 2008 AFC Champions League first Asian champions in the club history. In 2009 Emperor's Cup, although he could not play in the match, the club won the qualify to final. At the final, he played the match because Fujigaya became influenza and the club won the champions. This match is his last match and he retired end of 2009 season.

Club statistics

Honors
 2008 AFC Champions League
 2008 Pan-Pacific Championship
 2005 J1 League
 2009 Emperor's Cup
 2007 J.League Cup
 2007 Japanese Super Cup

See also
List of one-club men

References

External links

1974 births
Living people
Tenri University alumni
Association football people from Nara Prefecture
Japanese footballers
J1 League players
Gamba Osaka players
Association football goalkeepers